Stainton Pike is a hill in the English Lake District, near Waberthwaite, Cumbria. It is the subject of a chapter of Wainwright's book The Outlying Fells of Lakeland. The walk also passes the waterfall Rowantree Force and collection of ancient enclosures and hut circles known as Barnscar or City of Barnscar.

References

  

Fells of the Lake District